Mount Hebron is an unincorporated community in Marshall County, Alabama, United States. Mount Hebron is the hometown of Gilbert Johnson, who was one of the first African Americans to enlist in the United States Marine Corps, and one of the first African American drill instructors in the U.S. Marine Corps.

References

Unincorporated communities in Marshall County, Alabama
Unincorporated communities in Alabama